Ryori was a launching site for sounding rockets in Japan at  in Iwate Prefecture. It was operated by Japan Meteorological Agency, in use since April 1970 until March 2001.

Notes

External links
https://web.archive.org/web/20100131102750/http://astronautix.com/sites/ryori.htm

Rocket launch sites
Buildings and structures in Iwate Prefecture
Japan Meteorological Agency